Sleepy Eye Lake is a lake in Brown County, in the U.S. state of Minnesota. The lake is a 263-acre protected body of water.

History
Sleepy Eye Lake was named for Chief Sleepy Eye. The lake is used for recreation and fishing. In 2020 the Minnesota Pollution Control Agency decided to remove Sleepy Eye Lake from their impaired water list. The lake has improved nutrient levels.

See also
List of lakes in Minnesota
List of fishes of Minnesota

References

External links
Sleepy Eye Lake Topographical map

Lakes of Minnesota
Lakes of Brown County, Minnesota